Marcel Renouf (born 28 October 1953) is a French civil servant and former defence official. From 19 January 2015 to 2 February 2017 he served as the Administrator Superior of Wallis and Futuna.

Career
Renouf has served in various military and administrative roles such as Deputy Prefect for Security and Defence to the Prefect of the Brittany region and Detached civil administrator, head of the subdivision of the Windward Islands.

Honours
Renouf is a recipient of the National Order of Merit and the Ordre du Mérite Maritime.

References

Living people
1953 births
French civil servants
People from Manche
Administrator Superiors of Wallis and Futuna
Officers of the Ordre national du Mérite
Knights of the Ordre du Mérite Maritime